Leonid Aleksandrovich Kvinikhidze (21 December 1937 – 13 March 2018) was a Russian screenwriter and film director His father, Aleksandr Faintsimmer, was also a film director.

His first wife was the ballerina Natalia Makarova.

He died in Saint Petersburg on 13 March 2018.

Selected filmography

References

External links
 

1937 births
2018 deaths
Theatre directors from Saint Petersburg
Russian film directors
20th-century Russian screenwriters
Male screenwriters
20th-century Russian male writers
Soviet film directors
Soviet documentary film directors
Soviet screenwriters
Gerasimov Institute of Cinematography alumni
Soviet theatre directors
Soviet Jews
Russian Jews